Ryo Un-hui (born 9 August 1994) is a North Korean weightlifter. She competed at the 2013 World Championships in the Women's 69 kg, winning the Silver medal. She competed at the 2014 Asian Games in Incheon, South Korea. Ryo represents the Kigwancha Sports Team.

Major results

References

North Korean female weightlifters
1994 births
Living people
Weightlifters at the 2014 Asian Games
Asian Games medalists in weightlifting
World Weightlifting Championships medalists
Asian Games silver medalists for North Korea
Medalists at the 2014 Asian Games
21st-century North Korean women